Severo Frometa (born 9 August 1951) is a Cuban field hockey player. He competed in the men's tournament at the 1980 Summer Olympics.

References

External links
 

1951 births
Living people
Cuban male field hockey players
Olympic field hockey players of Cuba
Field hockey players at the 1980 Summer Olympics
Place of birth missing (living people)